The 2004 Purdue Boilermakers football team represented Purdue University during the 2004 NCAA Division I-A football season.  The team was coached by Joe Tiller and played its home games at Ross–Ade Stadium.  Purdue played twelve games in the 2004 season, finishing with a 7–5 record and a loss in the Sun Bowl to Arizona State. The season was Kyle Orton's senior year at Purdue.

Schedule

Game summaries

Syracuse

Source: ESPN
    
    
    
    
    
    
    
    

Optimism abounded toward the Purdue football program coached by Joe Tiller after a terrific '03 season.  Although the Boilermakers had 8 defensive starters to replace in 2004 (6 of whom were NFL draft picks), they returned most of their productive offense - including solid Seniors in QB Kyle Orton and catch-machine WR Taylor Stubblefield.

In the first-ever Sunday game at Ross Ade Stadium, Purdue played host to the perennially bowl-bound Syracuse Orange from the Big East.  However, on a brutally hot day, the Boilermaker offense and defense was on fire, handing the Orange an unexpectedly decisive defeat, 51–0.

Orton and the Purdue offense shook off a slow start (and a missed Ben Jones FG) to compile 571 yards of turnover-free offense, highlighted by 4 long Orton TD passes in a 16–30; 287 yard performance.  Even reserve QB Brandon Kirsch - playing for the first time since 2002 - got in on the rout by engineering 2 4th-quarter TD drives including a 47-yard TD pass to freshman TE Dustin Keller.

On the flipside, the new-look Purdue defense was terrific in holding first-time starting QB Joe Fields and the Syracuse offense to 197 total yards, 3 turnovers, and most impressively - 0 points.  Fields also got no help from his running game, as acclaimed RBs Walter Reyes and Damien Rhodes combined for only 36 yards on 17 carries.

Ball State

Purdue continued its outstanding start to 2004, improving to 2–0 by blasting the MAC's Ball State Cardinals 59–7.  The Boilermakers did the majority of the damage in an incredible first half that sent them to the locker room with a 45–0 advantage.

Kyle Orton performed phenomenally – 23-26; 329 yards and 5 TDs – in guiding the Purdue offense to 599 yards, 34 first downs and no turnovers.  WR Taylor Stublefield had 3 TD catches.  And the Purdue defense had another superb game, holding the Cardinals' offense to 197 total yards and nearly pitching another shutout until Ball State got on the board midway through the 4th quarter.

Illinois

The Boilermakers began Big Ten play by improving to 3–0 with a hard-earned road win over the Fighting Illini, 38–30.

Purdue took a lead it wouldn't relinquish early in the 2nd quarter on a short TD run by Orton, 17–10.  Late in the first half with the score 17–13, Orton noticed an oncoming 3rd down Illini blitz and audibled to flip a soft pass over the charging defense to RB Brandon Jones, who had snuck past the blitz.  Jones then ran untouched for a 49-yard TD and an 11-point advantage.

Illinois would get no closer than 4 points down the rest of the game, as the Illini defense couldn't give their offense a chance to tie until less than a minute remained in the game.  On the second play of Illinois' last-chance drive, DE Anthony Spencer forced a fumble on a sack of Illini QB Jon Beutjer that Purdue recovered to essentially end the game.

The Purdue offense – especially QB Kyle Orton – continued to excel by rolling up 515 total yards without committing a turnover. Orton threw for 366 yards and 4 TDs (plus the rushing TD).  Two of his TD passes came on 3rd down audibles – one of them to his top receiving target WR Taylor Stubblefield, who caught 11 passes for 115 yards and three touchdowns which increased his early season total to 8 TD catches.

While Purdue played near-perfect on offense, the young defense encountered its first struggles of the season with an Illinois offense that was able to effectively move via the run and pass for 390 yards.  In defeat, Illini RBs E. B. Halsey, Pierre Thomas and Jason Davis combined for 208 yards rushing.

It was at this point that Orton began to be mentioned as a top Heisman Trophy candidate.

Notre Dame

Source: ESPN
    
    
    
    
    
    
    
    
    
    

With another outstanding performance from QB Kyle Orton, the Boilermakers improved to 4–0 with a surprisingly decisive 41–16 victory over 3–1 Notre Dame.  This was the program's first win in South Bend since 1974 (in 13 tries).

After both teams' first drives ended in field goals, the game began to turn when Purdue kick returner Jerome Brooks returned an Irish kickoff 100 yards for a TD and a 10–3 lead.  Later in the 2nd quarter with Purdue holding a 13–3 lead and the Irish threatening to score, Purdue took control when DE Anthony Spencer forced a fumble from freshman RB Darius Walker that Purdue recovered.  Orton then led the Purdue offense 97 yards on a drive that culminated in a short TD toss to DE-turned-TE Rob Ninkovich, for a 20–3 halftime lead.

Early in the 3rd quarter, after a Notre Dame punt pinned Purdue at their 3-yard line, WR Taylor Stubblefield beat tight man coverage to catch a 97-yard TD pass for a backbreaking score and 27–3 lead.  The teams exchanged touchdowns for the rest of the 3rd quarter before a scoreless 4th quarter.

If not points, the Irish certainly rolled up yards (536) on the Purdue defense, as Quinn threw for a then-career-high 432 yards.  But some timely stops (including 7 sacks) by the Purdue defense, the untimely Walker fumble, and the defense's inability to stop Orton and the Purdue offense proved too much to overcome.

Meanwhile, Orton completed 21 of 31 passes for 385 yards and 4 touchdowns; two of his TD throws were to Stubblefield in a 7 catch, 181 yard performance.

It was at this point in the season that Kyle Orton was considered a Heisman Trophy front-runner, as he had 17 TD passes and no interceptions.  In fact, the Purdue offense still had yet to commit their first turnover of the season!

Penn State

Purdue improved to 5–0 for the first time since 1945 by overcoming a fired-up Penn State team in a 20–13 win, their first ever in Happy Valley in what was the very first "Penn State Whiteout".

Purdue gained an early 10–0 advantage with a 50-yard FG by Ben Jones followed by a short Brandon Jones TD run.  The key play of the TD drive was a 55-yard completion to TE Charles Davis.

But Senior QB Zack Mills, who had a fine day, led PSU back to tie the game at the half.  First, they answered Purdue's TD drive with a TD of their own – a 37-yard TD pass to a diving WR Terrell Golden.  Then, the Nittany Lions capped their next drive with a FG by K Robbie Gould.

Purdue took a 17–10 lead on their first drive of the 2nd half with a 40-yard TD pass from Kyle Orton to Taylor Stubblefield.  The Nittany Lions later drove deep into Purdue territory but had to settle for a short FG and still trailed 17–13 after 3 quarters.

On the first play of the 4th quarter, Orton (and Purdue) committed their first turnover of the season with a Calvin Lowry interception.  But PSU came up empty when Zack Mills was tackled short of the first down on a fake FG attempt.  After a second Orton interception resulted in a missed PSU field goal, Purdue  embarked on a gritty, time-consuming drive that ended with a long Ben Jones FG to regain a 7-point lead with less than 3 minutes left.  The drive was kept alive with a terrific individual effort by freshman WR Dorien Bryant on a 3rd and long play.

Rodney Kinlaw gave the Lions a great opportunity to tie on the ensuing kickoff with a 64-yard return, but Mills and the PSU offense came up empty with 4 incomplete passes.  Finally, on the last play, QB Anthony Morelli's desperation pass also fell incomplete.

In what became the prevailing 2004 theme for PSU, their defense did a commendable job vs. the high-powered Purdue offense by limiting it to 348 yards and sacking Orton 3 times.  The young Purdue defense held up well against the run by limiting PSU to 18 yards on 17 carries, and put a good pass-rush on Mills by sacking him 3 times.

In addition to catching his 11th TD pass of the season, Taylor Stubblefield set the Big Ten record for catches, surpassing former teammate John Standeford.

Wisconsin

In a wild game between two ranked opponents in West Lafayette, the Badgers handed #5 Purdue its first loss of the season. In the 4th Quarter Boilermaker QB Kyle Orton fumbled the ball and Badger DB Scott Starks returned the fumble for the go-ahead score. Within Purdue football fandom, this play is sometimes referred to as "The Fumble".  With the crushing loss, Purdue fell to 5–1 on the season.

Michigan

The 2-point loss to Michigan at home was the 2nd in a row for the Boilermakers.

Northwestern

Purdue fell to 5–3 on the season with a 3rd consecutive loss.

Iowa

With the loss, their fourth in a row, the Boilermakers fell to 5–4 on the season.

Ohio State

Purdue snapped their losing streak to the Buckeyes and their overall 4-game losing streak with a 24–17 win in West Lafayette, improving to 6–4 on the year. The Purdue win made it impossible for the Buckeyes to finish with a winning conference record in 2004.

Indiana

    
    
    
    
    
    
    
    
    
    
    
    
    

With the win (in the highest scoring game in series history), the Boilermakers finished 4–4 in Big Ten conference play. Purdue extended their home winning streak over the Hoosiers to 4 games (their last loss to the Hoosiers in Ross–Ade Stadium coming in the 1996 season). Joe Tiller and the Boilermakers finished the regular season with a 7–4 record.

Arizona State

Roster

2005 NFL Draft

References

Purdue
Purdue Boilermakers football seasons
Purdue Boilermakers football